Talahomi Way is the ninth studio album by London-based musical project The High Llamas, released on 19 April 2011 on Drag City.

Track listing
"Berry Adams" - 4:10
"Wander, Jack Wander" – 3:40
"Take My Hand" – 2:34
"Woven and Rolled" – 3:09
"The Ring of Gold" – 4:11
"Talahomi Way" – 3:32
"Fly Baby, Fly" – 3:00
"Angel Connector" – 1:01
"To The Abbey" – 3:17
"A Rock in May" – 3:21
"Crazy Connector" – 0:40
"Calling Up, Ringing Down" – 3:44

References

2011 albums
The High Llamas albums
Drag City (record label) albums